Sanjay Hanmantrao Puram was the member of the 13th Maharashtra Legislative Assembly. He was represents the Amgaon Assembly Constituency. He belongs to the Bharatiya Janata Party.

References

Maharashtra MLAs 2014–2019
Bharatiya Janata Party politicians from Maharashtra
Living people
People from Gondia district
Marathi politicians
Year of birth missing (living people)